Harling is a surname. Notable people with the surname include:

Sir Robert Harling (died 1435), who exerted great influence over East Harling
Robert Harling (writer) (born 1951), author of Steel Magnolias
Robert Harling (typographer) (1910–2008)
W. Franke Harling (1887–1958), Academy Award-winning songwriter
Kaine Harling (born 1957), film producer

See also

References

Surnames of Old English origin
Germanic-language surnames
Surnames of English origin